Maria Eisner (Maria Eisner Lehfeldt; February 8, 1909, in Milan, Italy – March 8, 1991, in New York, New York) was an Italian-American photographer, photo editor and photo agent. She was active in Europe in her early years, and later moved to the United States.

She was one of the founders of Magnum Photos. Before Magnum, she worked for Alliance Photo in Paris.

See also
David Seymour (Chim)
George Rodger

References

External links
Obituary (The New York Times)

1909 births
1991 deaths
Photographers from Milan
Italian women photographers
American women photographers
20th-century American photographers
Italian emigrants to the United States
20th-century American women artists